The Battle for Wesnoth is a free and open-source turn-based strategy video game with a high fantasy setting (similar to J. R. R. Tolkien's legendarium), designed by Australian-American developer David White and first released in June 2003. In Wesnoth, the player controls a particular faction/race and attempts to build a powerful army by controlling villages and defeating enemies for experience. The game is loosely based on the Sega Genesis games Master of Monsters and Warsong.

Gameplay 

The Battle for Wesnoth is a turn-based wargame played on a hex map. The strategy of battle involves trying to fight on favorable terrain, at a favorable time of day, and, if possible, with units that are strong or well suited against the enemies. Other concerns are capturing villages that produce a particular trickle rate of gold per turn for unit recruitment, and positioning units to restrict enemy movement. Games of Wesnoth come both in the form of single-player campaigns and multiplayer matches.

Each unit in Wesnoth has its own strengths and weaknesses. A unit's defense (which means in this case dodge chance) is based on the terrain it stands on. Elves, for example, are difficult to hit when fighting in a forest. Different types of attacks (melee and ranged), weapon types (pierce, blade, impact, arcane, cold, and fire), and a day-night cycle (in most maps) that alternately favors lawful and chaotic units, altering the amount of damage a unit deals. Units can advance to higher level counterparts and become more powerful as they participate in combat.

A central design philosophy of the game is the KISS principle; for a new idea to be accepted, it should not complicate gameplay. Another important facet of the game is randomness and its manipulation: it is never certain whether a unit's attack will fail or succeed, only likely or unlikely. Developers have stated that the potential for a skirmish to go better or worse than expected adds excitement, replayability and strategic depth to the game.

Setting

The Battle for Wesnoth takes place in a world populated by Tolkienesque races such as humans, elves, dwarves, orcs, and trolls, as well as Wesnoth-specific races such as dragon-like Drakes, which are creatures distantly related to dragons, but are bipedal, have an organized, albeit warlike, culture, and are only about 10 feet tall. Campaign stories span the history and geography of the world, but most focus on the eponymous human kingdom of Wesnoth, which suffers frequent invasions of orcish raiders and the undead.

The name Wesnoth was originally developed by the game's creator as a combination of syllables that he thought would sound good as a name for a fantasy land. When the project became larger and more elaborate, the developers created a fictional etymology for the name: the inhabitants of the land of Wesnoth came from the West and North, giving Westnorth, which eventually evolved to Wesnoth. This etymology is explained in the campaign The Rise of Wesnoth.

Factions

The Battle for Wesnoth currently has six default factions to choose from:
 Rebels
 Consist mostly of elvish units, with ent-like woses, mermen, and mages. Most of their level 1 units are capable of both melee and ranged attacks, making the rebels very versatile. Elves ignore the time of day with their neutral alignment and have high defense in forests. They are generally faster, but slightly weaker than other units in most other terrain.
 Knalgan Alliance
 These consist of slow but sturdy dwarves with strong melee attacks, allied with human outlaws who fight better under the cover of darkness. Generally, dwarves gain a high defense when occupying mountains and hills. Dwarves are also more adept at traversing caves than any other faction and ignore the time of day. They are vulnerable to attack in open terrain, while their human outlaws fight better in this same terrain.
 Loyalists
 These are human cavalry, mages and infantry that ordinarily fight better in the daytime, with mermen allies. They are the most diverse faction, with more units than any other faction except the Knalgan Alliance.
 Northerners
 A faction of orcs and goblins, along with troll and naga allies. Their focus is on cheap recruiting, brute force, and close combat, fighting better at night with their chaotic alignment. Most units require little XP (fighting experience) to advance levels. Units often achieve higher mobility when crossing hills.
 Undead
 The undead are vulnerable to fire, impact, and arcane attacks, but have high resistance against blade, pierce and especially cold damage. The undead rely on easy access to magic and poison attacks. Some units are able to drain health from enemies in order to replenish their own, and most are immune to poisoning. Unlike other races, most undead units have no traits and no personal names.
 Drakes
 A dragon-like race that fights better by day. Most can fly and breathe fire. Their Saurian allies are faster and prefer fighting by night and in swamp areas, though they share the Drakes' vulnerability to cold. Drakes are the most maneuverable faction, though their size makes them prone to attack in most terrain.

The exact units used by the factions, and the faction names, change based on the era or the campaign. The above are the factions of the "Default" era, which is the most played one on the multiplayer servers, and its extension "Age Of Heroes".

There are also a number of user-created factions, several of which are grouped together in downloadable "Eras." For example, the Imperial Era includes the Roman-influenced Lavinians, the Marauders, and the Wild Elves, featuring completely new unit trees and abilities. An alternative era, which contains the Islam-influenced faction Khalifate, was integrated (as of 6 January 2014) in the official development line, Wesnoth 1.11.8, tested to become part of the mainline version. However, it is quite possible to create factions that can be used in the default eras, though the amount of blessing given by the creators for each may vary.

Campaigns

The stable version of The Battle for Wesnoth comes with 17 single-player campaigns, each of which has various difficulty levels. More user-authored campaigns can be obtained in the form of add-ons stored on Wesnoth's campaign server, and these are sometimes mainlined as official campaigns. The original campaign for The Battle for Wesnoth was "Heir to the Throne", a campaign with 23 gameplay scenarios where Konrad, a young heir to the throne of Wesnoth, allies with rebellious elves and other races to claim the throne from the usurper queen Asheviere, her loyalist army, and her orcish mercenaries. Characters from "Heir to the Throne" are protagonists in campaigns such as "Legend of Wesmere" and "Delfador's Memoirs". Other campaigns feature different factions, like the dwarves in "The Hammer of Thursagan" or "Northern Rebirth" or "Sceptre of Fire", the loyalist army of Wesnoth in "The South Guard" or "The Eastern Invasion", and undead in "Descent into Darkness" or "Secrets of the Ancients". Even mermen can be played in "Dead Water", or orcs in "Son of the Black Eye". Finally, "Under the Burning Suns" is set in the distant future, long after the time of the other campaigns, featuring elves who fight better during the day.

A multiplayer campaign titled "World of Conquest" is added to the game on version 1.16 after previously being an unofficial add-on.

Unofficial campaigns 
Many official campaigns were only user-made add-ons, for example "An Orcish Incursion", which has been removed from the mainline in 1.15.3. Unofficial campaigns are translated into many languages the same way as the official ones. Some of them are very long and well balanced, like "Invasion from Unknown", while others serve to show units not available in the mainline, or as examples for future campaign makers, like "A simple campaign" or "The Final Exam". The longest unofficial campaigns have more translatable strings than the longest official campaigns.

Modding
Add-ons
It is possible to create and distribute additional content (user made content, or UMC), such as campaigns, maps and multiplayer "eras" using an "add-on" system. These add-ons can be downloaded, updated and removed using an in-game add-on server; alternatively, they can be installed and updated by manually downloading the add-on's files and placing them in the appropriate directory, or they can be removed by deleting these files.

Editor

The Battle for Wesnoth has a built-in map editor, which supports features such as multiple open maps and random map generation. The editor supports all in-game terrains, as well as custom terrains created for campaigns. The time of day can be selected from one of the built-in presets or custom lighting can be created.

WML
Using any standard text editor, new content can be created using what is known as Wesnoth Markup Language (WML). As its name suggests, WML is similar to XML and other markup languages in syntax with tags defining events and sides in a scenario. WML has evolved from what was a simple markup/configuration language into a specialized programming language designed for easily modifying the game. Examples for the latest stable version are offered on the site's wiki.

Lua
From the 1.7 development version upwards, code in Lua can be embedded in WML events which gets executed when those events fire. From 1.7.14 on, Lua can also be used to create alternate (or supplemental) AI implementations.

Development Version
Besides the official wesnoth game version, there is always an alternative development version, that introduces more new features and improvements for players and content creators. This development version is rolling subject to further tweaking and polishing, depending on the wesnoth community feedback. There is planned to deliver a high-quality and stable 1.12 release in the future, which could feature a seventh default faction, called Khalifate.  It should offer fresh and interesting multiplayer options. Khalifate units use no magic, but instead rely on careful use of terrain and coordinated strikes around dusk or dawn. The Islam-inspired Khalifate faction is still under development.

Development

David White began development of Wesnoth because he wanted to create a freely available, open source strategy game with very simple rules, but one that had difficult to beat artificial intelligence and that was challenging and fun — a game that was easy to learn but hard to master.

The game is programmed in C++. It is cross-platform, and runs on AmigaOS 4, BeOS, FreeBSD, Linux (including OS flavors running on GP2X and Nokia n800, n810, and n900 handheld devices), OS X/Darwin, Windows, MorphOS, NetBSD, OpenBSD, RISC OS, iOS, Solaris/illumos, Android, Playbook and Google Native Client running under Google Chrome.

Wesnoth development is decentralized due to its free and open-source nature. The officially blessed campaigns and units bundled with the game download are often derived from content created by the community, somewhat differently from the user-generated content in proprietary games where such content, while available, is usually not incorporated into official builds of the game. The Wesnoth forums and wiki are used to develop new campaigns, including new unit types and story artwork. The game is able to download new campaigns from a central add-on server. Content featured on the official campaign server must be licensed under the GNU GPL-2.0-or-later, like the game itself.

Even when not counting this community content, the list of contributors to the official version of the game as displayed in-game contains over 550 unique entries (May 2010). Developers of the game also include well-known authors from the free software and open source scene, like the co-founder of the Open Source Initiative and core Linux kernel developer Eric S. Raymond, or Linux kernel programmer Rusty Russell.

As of April 2010, The Battle for Wesnoth is available in about 50 languages, 9 of which have more than 90% of messages translated.

Active developers
As of September 2015, The Battle for Wesnoth announced their development team consisted of no more than five developers. On the homepage for the game, the reason for a lack of bug fixes was explained, "Sadly, a hard truth must be faced: Wesnoth, as a project, is understaffed. At this time, there are fewer than half a dozen developers working on each new version of the game, and even fewer of them are able to work on the engine itself".

Art
The art development team was founded by Francisco Muñoz, and directed by Richard Kettering with Hogne Håskjold as the director of terrain art. The current set of portraits were designed primarily by Kathrin Polikeit and Emilien Rotival, replacing the older set of comic-style portraits done by Jason Lutes. Most artwork is stored in the portable network graphics format and all are licensed under the GNU General Public License.

Music

The musical style of the game's soundtrack is orchestral, with a symphony of strings, brass, winds, percussion, and occasionally ethnic instruments when the game allows for it, covering a variety of genre and periods. Because the themes are based on traditional and medieval styles, the music development department rejects all music with synths, loops, drum kits, electric guitars, or any pop/rock instruments. Because Wesnoth has no budget and relies completely on volunteer composers, its soundtrack is entirely synthesized.

The music development team is currently headed by Mattias Westlund and includes some well-known composers like Doug Kaufman and Timothy Pinkham and the game's soundtrack is licensed as free music under the GNU General Public License and rendered in the Ogg Vorbis format.  Because the game is constantly evolving, the current list of soundtracks evolves.

Notes

Releases
The first development release of Wesnoth 0.1 happened on June 18, 2003. In October 2005, the game reached its 1.0 milestone release. On January 29, 2012, version 1.10 was released. 
On May 2, 2018, version 1.14.0 was released.

Aside of the stand-alone source and binary releases, Wesnoth was previously made available through the Desura digital distribution service. 
Wesnoth was submitted to Steam Greenlight on July 23, 2016, and was subsequently approved for release by the Steam community. On May 2, 2018, with the release of v1.14.0, the game became then available on Steam. At the same time, registration was made mandatory for playing on the official server.

Reception
Reviews for The Battle for Wesnoth have generally been positive. In a 2006 review of version 1.1 of the game, Gametunnel rated it a 7/10, adding that "it may seem like a game that belongs in the nineties, but it is engaging and very well put together".

In a 2007 review of version 1.2.6, Phoronix rated it 9/10, calling it "a must-download game for any gamer". In 2008 APCMag.com named The Battle for Wesnoth among the Top 5 best (free) open source games.

In 2010, Full Circle Magazine reviewed the game in Podcast #4. The reviewers called Wesnoth a "very good game", calling the graphics "simple" and "easy to understand" but "dated." The reviewers called the gameplay "pure and simple", but complained about the role of chance in the game, making it an "exercise in frustration", and requiring a policy of reloading and replaying the game that turns Wesnoth into a "challenge of patience rather than brainpower."

In 2010, RPGFan gave it an 88/100, mentioning that "Despite its generous price tag, BfW offers more quality and quantity than almost any commercial title available."

The game was described in-detail in the 2012 book "The Architecture of Open Source Applications".

Various versions of Wesnoth have been downloaded from the central download site SourceForge over seven million times between 2004 and March 2017. Multiple other freeware download outlets delivered the game additionally hundred thousand times; for instance MacUpdate counted over 80,000 downloads of the macOS version alone, Softonic counted another 150,000 downloads.

See also

List of free and open-source software packages
List of open-source video games
 Frogatto & Friends, another game by some of the developers of Wesnoth

Notes

References

External links

 
 
 Gna! project page
 
 The Architecture of Open Source Applications - Chapter 25. The Battle for Wesnoth by Richard Shimooka and David White (2012)

2003 video games
AmigaOS 4 games
Free software programmed in C++
GP2X games
Linux games
Lua (programming language)-scripted video games
MorphOS games
Multiplayer hotseat games
Open-source video games
Strategy video games
MacOS games
Tactical role-playing video games
Turn-based strategy video games
Windows games
Free software that uses SDL
Multiplayer and single-player video games
Video games developed in Australia
Computer wargames